The Great Mosque of Testour is a mosque located in the city of Testour in Beja Governorate, Tunisia. It is 76 km from the capital Tunis, in the center of the old city. It embodies the Andalusian architecture, especially its minaret, which features Andalusian style inscriptions and architectural elements. The height of the minaret is 23 meters and it is an octagonal shape. The facade of the minaret are opened with small double windows decorated with glazed inscriptions and a mechanical clock at the top. Its appearance is resembling the Aragonese bell towers in southern Spain. The prayer hall, in addition to the sahn located in the center of the mosque, can accommodate up to 1000 worshipers. The construction of the mosque used limestone, Spanish sand and marble in addition to colored porcelain and tiles used in the construction of the mihrab. The mosque dates back to 1631, and its patron is Muhammad Tigharinu an immigrant of Andalusian origin who settled at Testour in 1609.

See also
List of mosques in Tunisia

References

Buildings and structures completed in 1631
17th-century mosques
Mosques in Tunisia
Testour

Ottoman architecture in Tunisia